Rzgów  is a town in Łódź East County, Łódź Voivodeship, Poland, with 3,382 inhabitants (2020).
It was incorporated as a town from 1467 until 1870, then it was downgraded to a village.  On January 1, 2006 it became a town again.

Climate
Rzgów has a humid continental climate (Cfb in the Köppen climate classification).

<div style="width:70%;">

References

Cities and towns in Łódź Voivodeship
Łódź East County